Zeal & Ardor is a Swiss avant-garde metal band started and led by Manuel Gagneux, a Swiss-American musician who had previously created a chamber pop project called Birdmask. Formed in 2013, the band mixes sounds of African-American spirituals with black metal.

Initially a solo project, the band signed with MVKA records in 2016 and expanded to a full lineup, with Gagneux on vocals and guitar, backing vocalists Denis Wagner and Marc Obrist, guitarist Tiziano Volante, bassist Mia Rafaela Dieu, and drummer Marco Von Allmen. The project started in New York City, but is now based in Basel, Switzerland.

Zeal & Ardor have released the albums Devil Is Fine (2016), and Stranger Fruit (2018), as well as a demo album Zeal and Ardor (2014). In 2020, they released their first EP, Wake of a Nation. A third studio album, Zeal & Ardor, was released in February 2022.

History

Background 

Gagneux was born in Basel, Switzerland in 1989, to an African American mother and Swiss father. Both of Gagneux's parents were musicians, and he learned piano at an early age. Growing up, he frequently listened to grindcore and technical and melodic death metal artists. As a teenager, he was in an indie pop band named Hellelujah. After moving to New York City in 2012, Gagneux started Birdmask, a chamber pop project.

Gagneux posted his Birdmask music to 4chan, as he said "to get feedback because they're brutally honest and don't give a shit about you,". He would ask users for two musical genres to combine and create a song in half an hour, as an experiment to expand his creativity. One of these users suggested that he fuse "black metal", while another suggested "nigger music"; in response, he started Zeal & Ardor, which features elements of both black metal and slave songs. Other genres suggested included "Afro Djent, Nashville Power Electronics and Industrial Grunge". Gagneux later stated the band came from the question of "what if American slaves had embraced Satan instead of Jesus?".

Self-titled release and Devil Is Fine (2014–2016) 
The project's very first release was a work in progress of a song called "A Spiritual", released on SoundCloud on December 13, 2013. Gagneux self-released the demo album Zeal and Ardor to Bandcamp in June 2014.

The project's official debut album, Devil Is Fine, was first released on Bandcamp on April 15, 2016 Gagneux wrote and recorded the album himself. In November 2016, the band was featured on an article written by Bandcamp about black experimental metal. In June 2016, Rolling Stone featured Devil Is Fine as one of the "Best Metal Records of 2016 So Far".

On November 11, 2016, Gagneux announced his signing with the UK based record company MVKA. The lead single "Devil Is Fine" had a music video released on December 15, 2016. A second single, "Come On Down", was released on January 16, 2017. MKVA re-released Devil Is Fine on February 24, 2017. It charted at 17 on the Swiss Hitparade charts.

Expansion to full band and Stranger Fruit (2017–2019)
In 2017, the project became a full-fledged band with the addition of backing vocalists Denis Wagner and Marc Obrist, guitarist Tiziano Volante, bassist Mia Rafaela Dieu, and drummer Marco Von Allmen. Gagneux formed the full band after promoter Walter Hoeijmakers asked him to play Roadburn Festival. They opened for Prophets of Rage for two shows in London and Germany in 2017.

Zeal & Ardor offered a unique merchandise deal during their 2018 shows, fans could get free merchandise if they branded the band's logo onto their skin. Eight people took up the offer, with Gagneux saying "The intent was that no one would ever do it. Because that's the whole thing: you don't want this brand. If you do, you're just an idiot who is following, not thinking for yourself. If they want to underline my statement, that's fine with me. But eight people is enough. If they don't get the symbolism, let's not encourage them."

The next album, Stranger Fruit, was released on June 8, 2018. It was preceded by the singles "Gravedigger's Chant", "Waste", and "Built On Ashes".

In June 2018, the band's song "Devil Is Fine" from Devil Is Fine was featured in a trailer for the upcoming video game The Division 2.
In February 2019 the band announced "Live in London", a live album released on March 22.

Wake of a Nation and Zeal & Ardor (2020–present)
In September and October 2020, the band released five of the six songs from their first EP, Wake of a Nation, which was announced alongside the first two singles for release on October 23 of the same year. Gagneux wrote the songs in direct response to the murder of George Floyd earlier in 2020. Gagneux explained the EP in the announcement:

On May 25, 2021, the group released "Run" the first single off their upcoming self-titled third studio album. A second single, "Erase", was released on July 23. On September 1, 2021, a third single "Bow" was released. A fourth single "Götterdämmerung" was released on October 15. The song is sung mostly in German and described by Gagneux as "our most bare bones song yet. No gimmicks, no frills, no distractions, just rage." The self-titled album was released on February 11, 2022. On November 6, they performed a livestream concert from Museum Tinguely in Switzerland. A fifth single "Golden Liar" was released on December 1.

Tours and festival appearances
In June 2018, the band announced a North American tour with support from Astronoid, as well as a solo European tour. In 2019, they toured in support of Baroness and Deafheaven. During the later part of the 2019 tour, bassist Mia Rafaela Dieu missed several shows due to gastroparesis caused by Ehlers-Danlos syndrome, she was replaced by Lukas Kurmann. 2021 saw the band commence tour opening for Opeth and Mastodon. The band has toured alongside Meshuggah in Europe in late 2021 and early 2022, before embarking on their own headline tour through the UK and Europe in late 2022.

Zeal & Ardor have performed at many festivals, including the 2018 Montreux Jazz Festival. Download Festival, Lowlands, by:Larm, Musilac Music Festival, Primavera Sound, Wacken Open Air, Hellfest, Graspop Metal Meeting, Le Guess Who?, Copenhell, Eurosonic Noorderslag, Devilstone Open Air, and Reading and Leeds Festivals, among others.

Musical style and influences

Devil Is Fine features elements of soul, black metal, Delta Blues, folk, gospel as well as jazz and lo-fi influences. Several instrumental tracks feature electronic and drum and bass features. The band frequently utilizes tremolo guitar and blast beats.

Stranger Fruit retains many elements of the first album, as well as including Avant-garde metal, post-black metal and elements of Motown music and blues. Zeal & Ardor retains many elements of the previous albums, while also including industrial metal and blackgaze influences.

The band is influenced by artists such as Mayhem, Burzum, Darkthrone, Wendy Carlos, Tom Waits, Golem, Portishead, Naglfar, and Iron Maiden, as well as nu-metal bands such as Deftones and Limp Bizkit, who Gagneux states are his "guilty pleasures". Gagneux also lists writers Philip K. Dick and Octavia Butler as influences on his music.

Band members

Manuel Gagneux – lead vocals, lead guitar, rhythm guitar, synthesizer, programming (2013–present)
Denis Wagner – backing vocals (2017–present)
Marc Obrist – backing vocals (2017–present)
Tiziano Volante – rhythm guitar, lead guitar (2017–present)
Mia Rafaela Dieu – bass (2017–2019; on hiatus)
Lukas Kurmann – bass (2019–present)
Marco Von Allmen – drums (2017–present)

Discography

Devil Is Fine (2016)
Stranger Fruit (2018)
Zeal & Ardor (2022)

Awards and nominations

Notes

References

External links

Avant-garde metal musical groups
Musical groups established in 2013
Swiss black metal musical groups
Swiss heavy metal musical groups
2013 establishments in Switzerland